Greenwich station is about 400 m south-west of the district centre, in London, England. It is an interchange between National Rail between central London and Dartford (north Kent), and the Docklands Light Railway (DLR) between Lewisham to the south and Docklands and the City of London. It is in Travelcard Zones 2 and 3.

It is the nearest National Rail station to the centre of Greenwich, but Cutty Sark for Maritime Greenwich DLR station is closer to the town centre and its tourist attractions.

East of the station the Dartford line goes through a tunnel underneath the grounds of the National Maritime Museum, towards Maze Hill. Northwards, the DLR goes into a tunnel through Cutty Sark station and under the River Thames to the Isle of Dogs; in the opposite direction, it rises on a concrete viaduct to follow the River Ravensbourne upstream to Deptford Bridge and Lewisham.

Services

National Rail

The typical off-peak service in trains per hour is:
 2 tph to London Cannon Street
 2 tph to 
 2 tph to  via 

During the peak hours, the station is served by an additional half-hourly circular service to and from London Cannon Street via  and Lewisham in the clockwise direction and direct to   anticlockwise.

DLR
The typical DLR service in trains per hour is:
 12 tph to Bank
 12 tph to 

History 
The National Rail line is one of London's oldest – the London and Greenwich Railway is reputed to be the world's first suburban railway. It was designed by former army engineer George Landmann, and promoted by entrepreneur George Walter. A massive brick viaduct with 878 arches was built to a station in Spa Road (Bermondsey), and later to London Bridge. The line opened on 8 February 1836 from Deptford, and on 24 December 1838 from a temporary station in Greenwich. Greenwich's handsome station building was designed by George Smith and opened in 1840, making it one of the oldest station buildings in the world.

The South Eastern Railway (SER) leased the Greenwich branch from 1 January 1845.

The South Eastern and Chatham Railway was formed on 1 January 1899 and as such took over operation of the station. The SER and London Chatham and Dover Railway formed a "management committee" comprising the directors of both companies and merged the two companies' operations both of which were on the brink of bankruptcy forced by years of bitter competition.

Up to this point the four tracks through the station (two of which had platforms, two of which did not) terminated at a sector plate which is a traverser that rotates around a pivot that is not at the centre and therefore cannot rotate through 360˚. This saves space and means locomotives can be transferred from one track to another. The original railway company's board room was located at that end of the station behind the sector plate. Both of these features were removed when the line was extended towards Maze Hill.

Difficulties in extending the railway over land owned by the Greenwich Hospital led to the station remaining a terminus until the line was extended eastwards via a cut-and-cover tunnel towards Maze Hill, opening on 1 February 1878.

The Southern Railway took over operation of the station following the grouping of 1923.

Up until 1924 there had been two platform tracks and two tracks between them allowing overtaking moves. This facility was removed (possibly in preparation from the forthcoming electrification) and the empty space between the two platforms remained until the arrival of the Docklands Light Railway at the station in 1999.

Two years later following electrification works, a limited service worked by Electric Multiple Units commenced on 10 May 1926 with the full service commencing 19 July. The lines were electrified to the 750v DC system.

Following nationalisation, operation of the station passed to the Southern Region of British Railways on 1 January 1948.

The Docklands Light Railway (DLR) was extended to Lewisham via Greenwich on 20 November 1999, the new platforms lying immediately to the south of the main-line station, occupying the space originally used by the up main line platform, which was itself relocated into the space left 75 years earlier by the removal of the through lines. At the eastern end, the DLR heads underground through a tunnel through Cutty Sark and under the River Thames.

Connections
London Buses routes 129, 177, 199, 386, and night route N199 serve the station. The Quietway 1 cycle route terminates at the station.

References

External links 

 Docklands Light Railway website – Greenwich station page

Docklands Light Railway stations in the Royal Borough of Greenwich
Railway stations in the Royal Borough of Greenwich
Former South Eastern Railway (UK) stations
Railway stations in Great Britain opened in 1838
Railway stations in Great Britain closed in 1840
Railway stations in Great Britain opened in 1840
Railway stations in Great Britain closed in 1878
Railway stations in Great Britain opened in 1878
Railway stations served by Southeastern
Railway stations served by Govia Thameslink Railway